Karakashly (Qaraqaşlı) is a rural locality (a village) in Dyurtyulinsky Selsoviet, Sharansky District, Bashkortostan, Russia. The population was 61 as of 2010. There is 1 street.

Geography 
Karakashly is located 26 km southwest of Sharan (the district's administrative centre) by road. Yeremkino is the nearest rural locality.

References 

Rural localities in Sharansky District